In statistical classification, the Bayes classifier minimizes the probability of misclassification.

Definition

Assume that the conditional distribution of X, given that the label Y takes the value r is given by

 for 

where "" means "is distributed as", and where  denotes a probability distribution.

A classifier is a rule that assigns to an observation X=x a guess or estimate of what the unobserved label Y=r actually was. In theoretical terms, a classifier is a measurable function , with the interpretation that C classifies the point x to the class C(x).  The probability of misclassification, or risk, of a classifier C is defined as

The Bayes classifier is

In practice, as in most of statistics, the difficulties and subtleties are associated with modeling the probability distributions effectively—in this case, . The Bayes classifier is a useful benchmark in statistical classification.

The excess risk of a general classifier  (possibly depending on some training data) is defined as 
Thus this non-negative quantity is important for assessing the performance of different classification techniques. A classifier is said to be consistent if the excess risk converges to zero as the size of the training data set tends to infinity.

Proof of Optimality 
Proof that the Bayes classifier is optimal and Bayes error rate is minimal proceeds as follows.

Define the variables: Risk , Bayes risk , all possible classes to which the points can be classified . Let the posterior probability of a point belonging to class 1 be . Define the classifier as 

Then we have the following results:

(a) , i.e.   is a Bayes classifier,

(b) For any classifier , the excess risk satisfies 

(c) 

Proof of (a): For any classifier , we have 

 

  (due to Fubini's theorem)

Notice that  is minimised by taking ,

Therefore the minimum possible risk is the Bayes risk, .

Proof of (b): 

Proof of (c):

The general case that the Bayes classifier minimises classification error when each element can belong to either of n categories proceeds by towering expectations as follows.

This is minimised by simultaneously minimizing all the terms of the expectation using the classifier 

for each observation x.

See also
Naive Bayes classifier

References

Bayesian statistics
Statistical classification